Ronald Jacques Piché (May 22, 1935 – February 3, 2011) was a Canadian professional baseball pitcher who played in Major League Baseball (MLB) for the Milwaukee Braves, Los Angeles Angels and St. Louis Cardinals.

Biography
Piché's professional pitching career lasted for 17 seasons between 1955 and 1972 (sitting out the 1971 campaign), and included 134 games played in the majors. Only in 1963, when he worked in 37 games for Braves, all but one of them out of the bullpen, did he spend a full campaign at the major league level. All told, Piché had a 10–16 win–loss record with 12 saves. Although he started only 11 of his 134 career MLB games pitched, he threw three complete games. In  innings pitched, he allowed 216 hits and 123 bases on balls, with 157 strikeouts, while posting a career 4.19 earned run average (ERA).

Piché appeared in 500 minor league baseball games, compiling a 130–65 career record (.667 winning percentage) with an ERA of 2.96. After retiring from the mound, he served in the Montreal Expos organization as a minor league coach, an administrator in their ticket office, and as the Expos' bullpen coach in 1976 under managers Karl Kuehl and Charlie Fox.

One of Piché's best days in the major leagues occurred on May 30, 1962. He was the starting pitcher for the Braves in the first game of a doubleheader against the Cincinnati Reds. He pitched a complete game, allowing six hits, and also got his first and only major league hit. In the last of the fourth inning, with two outs and runners on first and second, he hit a single to shortstop Leo Cárdenas, driving in two runs and reaching second on an error by Cárdenas. The Braves won the game, 4–3.

During his time in the major leagues, Piché was a teammate of at least eight National Baseball Hall of Fame players: Hank Aaron, Eddie Mathews, Red Schoendienst, Warren Spahn, Lou Brock, Steve Carlton, Orlando Cepeda and Bob Gibson.  

Piché was also a volunteer firefighter with the Montreal Auxiliary Firemen. He was inducted to the Canadian Baseball Hall of Fame in 1988. He died of cancer on February 3, 2011, at age 75.

References

External links

1935 births
2011 deaths
Auxiliary firefighters
Baseball people from Quebec
Buffalo Bisons (minor league) players
Canadian expatriate baseball players in the United States
Deaths from cancer in Quebec
Denver Bears players
Eau Claire Braves players
Evansville Braves players
Jacksonville Braves players
Los Angeles Angels players
Louisville Colonels (minor league) players
Major League Baseball bullpen coaches
Major League Baseball pitchers
Major League Baseball players from Canada
Milwaukee Braves players
Montreal Expos coaches
Montreal Expos scouts
People from Verdun, Quebec
Québec Carnavals players
St. Louis Cardinals players
Seattle Angels players
Baseball players from Montreal
Syracuse Chiefs players
Tacoma Cubs players
Toronto Maple Leafs (International League) players
Tulsa Oilers (baseball) players
Vancouver Mounties players
Winnipeg Whips players
Canadian Baseball Hall of Fame inductees